Pat or Patrick Moylan may refer to:
 Pat Moylan (politician) (born 1946), Irish Fianna Fáil politician
 Pat Moylan (Cork hurler) (born 1949), Irish hurler for the Cork senior team
 Pat Moylan (Offaly hurler), Irish hurler for the Offaly senior team